Mousa Majid Al Allaq (born June 30, 1986) is a Qatari footballer.

International career
The defender has regularly represented Qatar in the under-23 national football team. In 2011, after winning the Qatar Stars League championship with his club Lekhwiya, Mousa was called up in the senior national football team for the 2014 FIFA World Cup qualification (AFC) against Vietnam.

External links

1986 births
Living people
Qatari footballers
Qatar SC players
Lekhwiya SC players
Al-Gharafa SC players
Al Kharaitiyat SC players
Al-Shamal SC players
Mesaimeer SC players
Al Bidda SC players
Qatar Stars League players
Qatari Second Division players
Association football forwards